Leslie Township is a civil township of Ingham County in the U.S. state of Michigan. The population was 2,389 at the 2010 census. The township completely surrounds the city of Leslie, but the two are administered autonomously.

Geography

Sycamore Creek has its headwaters in the township.

Demographics
As of the census of 2000, there were 2,327 people, 855 households, and 670 families residing in the township. There were 879 housing units at an average density of 25.1 per square mile (9.7/km2). The racial makeup of the township was 97.29% White, 0.39% African American, 0.17% Native American, 0.09% Asian, 1.03% from other races, and 1.03% from two or more races. Hispanic or Latino people of any race were 1.72% of the population.

There were 855 households, out of which 33.0% had children under the age of 18 living with them, 69.0% were married couples living together, 5.6% had a female householder with no husband present, and 21.6% were non-families. 16.0% of all households were made up of individuals, and 6.2% had someone living alone who was 65 years of age or older.  The average household size was 2.72 and the average family size was 3.03.

In the township the population was spread out, with 25.3% under the age of 18, 6.6% from 18 to 24, 30.9% from 25 to 44, 27.4% from 45 to 64, and 9.8% who were 65 years of age or older.  The median age was 38 years. For every 100 females, there were 98.9 males.  For every 100 females age 18 and over, there were 98.9 males.

The median income for a household in the township was $55,476, and the median income for a family was $58,789. Males had a median income of $43,068 versus $28,510 for females. The per capita income for the township was $23,179.  About 4.4% of families and 6.7% of the population were below the poverty line, including 6.1% of those under age 18 and 5.4% of those age 65 or over.

References

External links
Leslie Township
Leslie Branch of the Capital Area District Library

Townships in Michigan
Townships in Ingham County, Michigan
Lansing–East Lansing metropolitan area
Populated places established in 1836
1836 establishments in Michigan Territory